The Tarnished Gold is the third full-length album released on June 26, 2012 by Los Angeles based alt-country band Beachwood Sparks and their fourth release on US label Sub Pop.

Track listing

References

External links
The Tarnished Gold on Sub Pop
Beachwood Sparks on Sub Pop

Beachwood Sparks albums
2012 albums
Sub Pop albums
Albums produced by Thom Monahan